Stephanie McCormick is the former head women's college basketball coach for the Western Carolina Catamounts. She replaced head coach Karen Middleton  prior to the 2015–2016 season.

Playing history
Born in High Point, North Carolina, McCormick attended Catawba College in Salisbury. She was the first player in school history to obtain both 1,000 career points and rebounds, and she holds Catawba's school record for both career (1,244) and single season rebounds (374). In 1994, she graduated with a bachelor of arts degree. In 2013, she was inducted into the Catawba College Sports Hall of Fame.

Coaching history
McCormick went on to begin her coaching career, mostly as an assistant, at Western Carolina (1994–97, 2004–09), UNC Wilmington (1997–2001), UNC Charlotte (2001–03), Georgia Tech (2003–04), North Carolina State University (2009–13), and Siena College (2013–15). In April 2015, she was named the eleventh head coach for the Western Carolina women's basketball team, becoming  the first African American coach in the school's athletic history.

References

External links
Profile at catamountsports.com

Western Carolina Catamounts women's basketball coaches
1970s births
Living people
Sportspeople from High Point, North Carolina
American women's basketball coaches